Streptomyces kebangsaanensis is a bacterium species from the genus of Streptomyces which has been isolated from the plant Portulaca oleracea in the Nenasi Reserve Forest in Pahang in Malaysia. Streptomyces kebangsaanensis produces the antibiotic tubermycin B.

See also 
 List of Streptomyces species

References

Further reading

External links
Type strain of Streptomyces kebangsaanensis at BacDive -  the Bacterial Diversity Metadatabase

kebangsaanensis
Bacteria described in 2013